Chuk Yuen may refer to several places in Hong Kong:
 Chuk Yuen (North District), in Ta Kwu Ling, North District
 Chuk Yuen (Sai Kung District), in Sai Kung District
 Chuk Yuen (Wong Tai Sin District) or Chuk Un, in Wong Tai Sin District
 Chuk Yuen (Yuen Long District), in Yuen Long District. It includes Sheung Chuk Yuen and Ha Chuk Yuen

See also
 Chuk Yuen Estate, a public housing estate in Wong Tai Sin
 Chuk Yuen North (constituency), a constituency of the Wong Tai Sin District Council
 Chuk Yuen South (constituency), a constituency of the Wong Tai Sin District Council